Bandafassi Arrondissement  is an arrondissement of the Kédougou Department in the Kédougou Region of Senegal.

Subdivisions
The arrondissement is divided administratively into rural communities and in turn into villages.

Arrondissements of Senegal
Kédougou Region